A ripoff (or rip-off) is an unfavorable financial transaction. Usually it refers to an incident in which a person is overcharged for something, or receives goods or services not of the standard expected for the price. A ripoff is usually distinguished from a scam in that a scam involves wrongdoing such as a fraud; a ripoff may be considered excessive, but not illegal.

See also

Rip-off Britain
Spin-off
Knock-off
Plagiarism
Mockbuster

References

Pricing controversies